"She Used to Be Mine" is a song written by American singer-songwriter Sara Bareilles for Waitress, a musical stage adaptation of the 2007 film of the same name. It was recorded by Bareilles for her fifth studio album, What's Inside: Songs from Waitress (2015), and was released to digital retailers as its lead single on September 25, 2015.

The song was recorded by Jessie Mueller for the cast recording of the Broadway production of Waitress in 2016, and performed by Mueller and Bareilles at the 70th Tony Awards. The song was also featured as a bonus track on country singer Jennifer Nettles' Broadway album Always Like New ahead of her taking over the role of Jenna from Bareilles in October 2021.

Composition
"She Used to Be Mine" is a sentimental ballad written and composed by Sara Bareilles with a duration of four minutes and ten seconds (4:10). The song is instrumented primarily by the piano and also features guitar and drums. Bareilles' vocal performance has been described as "powerful", with a vocal range of F3 to D5. According to the digital sheet music published by Sony/ATV Music Publishing, the song is composed in the key of F major with a "moderately slow" tempo. Lyrically, the song discusses losing one's sense of self and struggling with changes in circumstances, sung from the perspective of the musical's protagonist, Jenna. In the Broadway production, it is usually played in the key of G-flat major, and was played in the key of G major for the original Boston production. When both Sara Bareilles and Betsy Wolfe took on the roles, the song was played again in F major.

Critical reception
Madison Vain of Entertainment Weekly called the song "delicate, nostalgic, and wonderfully theatrical," in the magazine's "7 Tracks We Loved This Week" feature and praised the song as "a beautiful introduction" to the musical's story. Charles Isherwood of The New York Times said it is a “gentle but wrenching song, featuring a melody that soars and then recedes in waves, is the high point of the show—and for that matter a high point of the Broadway season. Suddenly, a pleasant and polished but weightless musical comedy rises to transporting heights, and sweeps up your heart along with it.”

Context within the musical 
This number takes place in Act 2 of the musical Waitress, when Jenna, the protagonist, is reflecting on her life. Jenna thinks about the kind of person she once was and how her life has disappointed her. Bareilles explained the story behind this song during a Reddit AMA: "I wrote it for the scene in the movie where the lead character, Jenna, feels like she's lost all hope of saving herself from her terrible situation, and she's reflecting on who she thought she would have become.

Expansion beyond Broadway 
Bareilles in an interview with the New York Times said that, “the range of who this song speaks to is much broader than I could have anticipated ...The chasm between who we are, and who we thought we would be, is always something we’re negotiating ... In the life of ‘Waitress,’ people make an assumption that it’s a very feminine show, and it is, and I love that. But these themes go so far beyond gender.” Jesse Green, the co-chief theater critic for The New York Times, reflects that the emotional content has a classic arc from sadness and self-criticism to acceptance and triumph.

Live Performance 

"She Used To Be Mine" was performed at the 2016 Tony Awards by Sara Bareilles and Jessie Mueller, as well as countless other cabarets and concerts that can be viewed online. Some notable ones include the Miscast Cabaret, hosted by MCCTheater (performed by Jeremy Jordan) , as well as Jordin Sparks' rendition on the Broadway.com live concert series on YouTube, ClubBroadway.comSara Bareilles and Brandi Carlile performed ‘She Used To Be Mine’ at Girls Just Wanna Weekend 4

Commercial performance
"She Used to Be Mine" was the most-added song on hot adult contemporary (Hot AC) radio the week of its release, according to radio monitoring organization Mediabase. The song debuted at number 40 on the Billboard Adult Pop Songs chart on the chart dated October 17, 2015.

Charts

Release history

References

2015 songs
2015 singles
2010s ballads
Pop ballads
Sara Bareilles songs
Epic Records singles
Rock ballads
Songs written by Sara Bareilles
Song recordings produced by Neal Avron
Songs about pregnancy
Songs from musicals
Soul ballads